Mir Yar Beg was a ruler within Badakhshan, who in the early 19th century was defeated by the Khan of Kunduz, Mir Muhammad Murad Beg.

References

People from Badakhshan Province
Year of death unknown
Year of birth unknown